Penicillium erythromellis is an anamorph species of the genus of Penicillium.

See also
 List of Penicillium species

References

Further reading

 
 
 

erythromellis
Fungi described in 1979